Deutschland was a blockade-breaking German merchant submarine used during World War I. It was developed with private funds and operated by the North German Lloyd Line. She was the first of seven -class U-boats built and one of only two used as unarmed cargo submarines.

After making two voyages as an unarmed merchantman, she was taken over by the German Imperial Navy on 19 February 1917 and converted into U-155, armed with six torpedo tubes and two deck guns. As U-155, she began a raiding career in June 1917 that was to last until October 1918, sinking 120,434 GRT of shipping and damaging a further 9,080 GRT of shipping.

Construction
Deutschland was one of seven submarines designed to carry cargo between the United States and Germany, through the naval blockade of the Entente Powers. Mainly enforced by Great Britain's Royal Navy, the blockade had led to great difficulties for German companies in acquiring raw materials which could not be found in quantity within the German sphere of influence, and thus substantially hindered the German war effort.
   

Deutschland was built together with her sister ship  in 1916 for the German Ocean Navigation, Deutsche Ozean-Reederei (DOR), a private shipping company created for the enterprise, a subsidiary company of the North German Lloyd shipping company (now Hapag-Lloyd) and the Deutsche Bank. She was constructed without armaments, with a wide beam to provide space for cargo. The cargo capacity was 700 tons (230 tons of rubber could be stored in the free-flooding spaces between the inner and outer hulls), relatively small compared to surface ships.

Britain and France soon protested against the use of submarines as merchant ships, arguing that they could not be stopped and inspected for munitions in the same manner as other cargo vessels. The US, under diplomatic pressure for supposedly showing favoritism while having declared itself neutral, rejected the argument. Even submarines, as long as they were unarmed, were to be regarded as merchant vessels and accordingly would be permitted to trade.

Only two submarines were completed according to the original design: Deutschland and Bremen, which was lost on its maiden voyage, also to the United States. Due to the United States' entry into the war, the other five submarine freighters were converted into long-range cruiser submarine (U-kreuzers), equipped with two 150mm deck guns and were known as the Type U 151 class.

Merchant service

First journey
Deutschland departed on her first voyage to the US on 23 June 1916 commanded by Paul König, formerly of the North German Lloyd company. On her maiden voyage, she carried 750 tons of cargo in total, including 125 tons of highly sought-after chemical dyes, mainly Anthraquinone and Alizarine derivatives in highly concentrated form, some of which were worth as much as $1,254 a pound in 2005 money. She also carried medical drugs, mainly Salvarsan, gemstones, and diplomatic mails, her cargo being worth $1.5 million in total ($ million in ).

Deutschland waited a week at Heligoland after the announced sailing date to avoid enemy patrols. She submerged for only  of the  outbound voyage. She did not enter the English channel but took a northern passage around Scotland. At 1:20 a.m. on 9 July Cape Henry was sighted and contact made with the Eastern Forwarding Company tug Thomas Timmins which had been specially altered to tow Deutschland alongside and been waiting some days. At 11:00 p.m. on 9 July 1916 the two vessels reached Baltimore. She arrived at the Quarantine anchorage off of Marley Neck, Anne Arundel county, just outside of what was then Baltimore city limits. after just over two weeks at sea. A photograph by Karle Netzer was made the next morning, 10 July. (erreichte Baltimore Hafen 10 Juli 1916). During their stay in Baltimore, the German crewmen were welcomed as celebrities for their astonishing journey and even taken to fancy dinners and an impromptu volksfest in the southwest part of the city. American submarine pioneer Simon Lake visited Deutschland while she was in Baltimore, and made an agreement with representatives of the North German Lloyd line to build cargo submarines in the US, a project which never came to fruition when the United States declared war on Germany in early April, 1917.

She stayed at Baltimore until 2 August, when she sailed for Bremerhaven, arriving on 24 August with a cargo of 341 tons of nickel, 93 tons of tin, and 348 tons of crude rubber (257 tons of which were carried outside the pressure hull). Her cargo was valued at $17.5 million, several times the submarine's construction costs.

Second journey

Deutschland made another round trip in November 1916 to New London, Connecticut with $10 million of cargo ($  in ) including gems, securities, and medicinal products. At the same time the submarine  also crossed the Atlantic to visit Newport, Rhode Island, and sank five Allied freighters just outside US territorial limits before returning home.

On 17 November as she was putting to sea, Deutschland accidentally rammed the tugboat T. A. Scott, Jr., which turned across her path suddenly while escorting her from New London to the open ocean. T. A. Scott, Jr., sank immediately with the loss of her entire crew of five. Deutschlands bow was damaged, and she had to return to New London for repairs, which delayed her departure by a week. She finally left New London on 21 November 1916, with a cargo that included 6.5 tons of silver bullion.

Following his last voyage, Captain Paul König collaborated to write a book about the journeys of Deutschland, entitled Voyage of the Deutschland, the First Merchant Submarine (Verlag Ullstein & Co, Berlin 1916, and, Hearst International Library Co., New York 1916). The book was heavily publicized, as it was intended to sway public opinion in both Germany and the US.

War service
A third voyage, planned for January 1917, was aborted as German-US relations had worsened following the sinking of shipping bound for the United Kingdom, often just outside US territorial waters. Deutschland was taken over by the German Imperial Navy on 19 February 1917 and converted into U-155, part of the U-Kreuzer Flotilla, being fitted with 6 bow torpedo tubes with 18 torpedoes, and two 15 cm SK L/40 naval gun taken from the pre-dreadnought battleship . She made three successful war cruises, sinking 43 ships and damaging three.

1917
During the summer of 1917 U-155 made a 105-day cruise, commanded by Kptlt. Karl Meusel, leaving Germany around 24 May and returning on 4 September. During her traverse of the Northern Passage around the northern end of the British Isles and out into the Atlantic Ocean, she was stalked and nearly sunk by  near Utsira Island, Norway.

During this patrol, the boat fired on the port city of Ponta Delgada in the Azore Islands on 4 July at 3 a.m. with its deck guns. Portuguese army units did not respond due to being equipped with obsolete artillery. The collier  happened to be in port at the time undergoing repairs. Its company returned U-155s fire and dueled with the German boat for about 12 minutes. U-155 submerged without being hit and eventually retired. While the raid was light in damage (it killed four people), it alarmed Allied naval authorities about the defenseless nature of the Azores and their possible use as a base by boats like U-155 in the future. Allied naval forces, led by the U.S. Navy, began to send ships and establish a naval operating base in Ponta Delgada as a result.

During her patrol she sank 19 merchant ships, most by either scuttling or gunfire. She attacked 19 Allied armed merchantmen but only succeeded in sinking 9 of them.

1918
U-155 sailed from Kiel on 11 August 1918 commanded by Ferdinand Studt. Studt's orders directed him to cruise off the US coast in the region of the Nantucket lightship and lay mines off St. John's, Newfoundland and Halifax, Nova Scotia. His orders, however, proved problematic, and Studt came to believe that the St. Johns where he was to lay mines was actually Saint John, New Brunswick, in the Bay of Fundy.

On 7 September U-155 found herself in a long range gun duel with the US steamer Frank H. Buck, with the steamer later claiming to have sunk U-155.

On 13 September U-155 engaged in another gun fight with the British merchantman Newby Hall, which managed to damage the submarine, denting her armour and causing serious leaks in her pressure hull which made diving temporarily impossible.

On 19 September, Studt tried and failed to locate and cut the telegraph cable near Sable Island, then headed for Nantucket.

Fate

U-155 returned to Germany from her final cruise on 12 November 1918 and was surrendered to the Allies at Harwich 24 November 1918 with other submarines as part of the terms of the Armistice. She was exhibited at St Katharine's Dock, London, in December 1918, and then at Liverpool, before being laid up at Rosyth. There, she was sold on 3 March 1919 to James Dredging Co. for £3,500, and then rapidly sold-on to Noel Pemberton Billing for £17,000, and then to John Bull Ltd (£15,000), a vehicle for Horatio Bottomley, who demilitarised the boat and embarked on a commercial tour that began at Great Yarmouth in September 1919, with the vessel re-christened Deutschland. At the end of the tour, in June 1921 she was taken into dock for stripping at Clover, Clayton Birkenhead, where, on  17 September 1921, an explosion in the engine room killed five apprentices. The hulk was sold to Robert Smith & Son, Birkenhead, for £200 in June 1922, and broken up at Rock Ferry.

Summary of raiding history

See also
 , World War II, Italian cargo submarines
 , World War II, Marcello-class submarine that was converted into a transport
 , World War II, Marcello-class submarine that was converted into a transport
 Submarine Cargo Vessel, modern Russian cargo submarine proposal

References

Notes

Citations

Bibliography

External links

A Political Submarine, 1916 (Scientific American, this Week in World War I: July 22, 1916)
When Lloyd went Underwater (Photos, including under construction)
Video: Merchant Submarine Deutschland arriving in Baltimore, 9 July 1916.
Video: Historic footage of submarine Deutschland departing New London, Connecticut, 21 November 1916, following repairs from tugboat collision.

German U-Boat Deutschland Arrives in Baltimore (1916) - Ghosts of Baltimore blog

German Type U 151 submarines
U-boats commissioned in 1916
World War I submarines of Germany
Merchant submarines
World War I merchant ships of Germany
U-boats commissioned in 1917
1916 ships
Ships built in Flensburg
Maritime incidents in 1916